Salo is a town and municipality of Finland. It is located in the Southwest Finland region.
The municipality is unilingually Finnish.

In Finnish salo means woodland, backwoods but also a wooded island. It is thought that Salo has meant the island that over thousand years ago existed to the south of the current town but is today (due to the post-glacial rebound typical in the area) a hill, not even very close to the sea.

Salo is located between the capital Helsinki (distance ) and the provincial capital Turku (distance ), making it a busy small city. The short distance from these bigger cities keeps the Salo region and its business life growing. Farming also plays a considerable part in the area. Salo's neighbouring municipalities are Koski Tl, Lohja, Kimitoön, Marttila, Paimio, Raseborg, Sauvo and Somero. It also is sister cities with Saint Anthony Village of Minnesota.

Once the town's main claim to fame, Salo had a large consumer electronics and mobile phone industry, with a manufacturing plant operated by Nokia and briefly by Microsoft Mobile in the 2010s until it was shut down. Nokia was once the dominant employer in the town, and the plant's closure in 2015 has led to high unemployment.

Salo is the birthplace of the president of Finland Sauli Niinistö.

History
Salo has existed as a centre of rural commerce since at least the 16th century, emerging in the location where the Great Coastal Road, the important East-West road, crossed River Salo; the river provided the fairway to the sea. In 1887 Salo officially became a market town and, in the beginning of 1891, an independent municipality. The area of the municipality was initially very small, only 0.65 km². In 1932 it grew to 18 km² when areas from neighbouring Uskela and Halikko were annexed to Salo. Eventually Salo became a town in 1960. The municipality of Uskela was consolidated with Salo 1967. The municipalities of Halikko, Kiikala, Kisko, Kuusjoki, Muurla, Perniö, Pertteli, Suomusjärvi and Särkisalo were consolidated with Salo in the beginning of 2009.
Salo is also a popular last name in Finland.

Industry
Salo was well known in Finland and around the world for its large mobile phone factory operated by Nokia. Nokia first started producing mobile phones in Salo in 1981. A new plant, 15,000 square metres, opened in June 1995. By this time 1,200 people were employed there, and it exported products to 70 countries as of 1995. As of 2008, 5,000 people were employed at the plant.

In 2012 amid heavy financial losses, Nokia laid off a third of Salo's 3,500 workforce and gradually shifted manufacturing to Asia. It had a negative impact on the town with unemployment rising. In 2010 Nokia accounted for 95% of the town's corporate tax income, amounting to €60 million, but this dropped to just €14 million by 2012. By the end of the year Salo no longer produced hardware and became a research and development centre.

After the centre was in the hands of Microsoft Mobile, layoffs continued and eventually in June 2015 Microsoft announced the closure of the plant, putting the jobs of the 1,100 employees at risk. By this time Salo's unemployment rate was 15%, and the layoffs could push that further to 20%. Solidarity was expressed by some Finnish politicians after Salo's decline, which also came amid Finland's slow post-2008 crisis economy.

Sports
The city is home to the professional basketball team Salon Vilpas Vikings, which plays in the Finish 1st Division Korisliiga. It plays its home games in the Salohalli. The most important orienteering club is Angelniemen Ankkuri, which organizes the Halikko relay every autumn.

Transportation

European route E18 runs through Salo, passing the city center a few kilometers North, but the national road 52 between Raseborg and Somero goes through the city center. The "Coastal Railway" from Helsinki to Turku and further to Turku Harbour crosses the town center; all InterCity trains and most of the high-speed Pendolino trains stop at Salo railway station. The closest airports are Turku Airport (limited number of domestic and international flights) and Helsinki-Vantaa Airport.

In 2016, the city of Salo signed a letter of intent with Los Angeles-based company Virgin Hyperloop One in order to launch a project to build a 50 km long Hyperloop tube between Salo and Turku.

Events
In recent years, the town of Salo has become known for the popular Kurpitsaviikot ("Pumpkin Weeks"), which are organized in Halikko in every autumn. At the local field, thousands of different sizes pumpkins and carved jack-o'-lanterns are presented to tourists. The event celebrating Halloween culture has gathered audiences from all over Finland, from Hanko to Ivalo, and for example, the event organized in 2020 had as many as 100,000 visitors. The event has also been noticed abroad, all the way to North America.

International relations

Twin towns — eleven cities
Salo has eight sister cities:
 Anija, Estonia
 Elva, Estonia
 Gárdony, Hungary
 Nagykanizsa, Hungary
 Odder, Denmark
 Puchheim, Germany
 Rzhev, Russia
 St. Anthony, Minnesota, USA
 Wuhan, China
 Danang, Vietnam

References

Photo gallery

External links

Town of Salo – Official website

 
Cities and towns in Finland
Populated coastal places in Finland
1887 establishments in Finland
Populated places established in 1887